Raw Silk Uncut Wood is a mini-album by Berlin-based American electronic musician Laurel Halo, released on July 13, 2018, through Latency Recordings. It consists of six ambient instrumental tracks.

Release
Halo announced the release of a "mini-LP" titled Raw Silk Uncut Wood on June 13, 2018, alongside the release of the title track. In a press release, Halo stated that the album was inspired by her work on the 2018 documentary film, Possessed. The album features contributions from cellist Oliver Coates and percussionist Eli Keszler. It was described as "a meditative, cinematic listening experience."

The title is derived from Ursula Le Guin's translation of the Tao Te Ching.

Critical reception

Raw Silk Uncut Wood received acclaim from music critics upon release, with a Metacritic weighed aggregate score of 84 out of 100 based on seven reviews. Writing for Pitchfork, Sasha Geffen said "Raw Silk Uncut Wood marks a departure from her usual mode of thorny, cerebral electronic compositions, but as her most ambient record to date, it also boasts some of her most unabashedly beautiful music." Hans Kim of PopMatters said, "Whether Raw Silk Uncut Wood is the precursor to a forthcoming ambient full-length or just another stint of experimentation, Laurel Halo continues to break expectations in the most bemusing way. The mini-album is a beautiful practice of minimalism that also maintains her intricate perspective." Resident Advisors Nina Posner wrote, "Inspired by this sentiment, as well as Halo's time scoring a film for the Dutch art collective Metahaven, the more abstract aspects of Raw Silk Uncut Wood allow her to establish moods that are at once non-prescriptive and immediately visceral."

Accolades

Track listing

Personnel
Credits adapted from the liner notes of Raw Silk Uncut Wood.
 Laurel Halo – production
 Oliver Coates – cello 
 Eli Keszler – percussion 
 Jill Mulleady – artwork
 Hugo Blanzat – design

References

External links
 Raw Silk Uncut Wood at Latency

2018 albums
Laurel Halo albums